Robert Wilson Andrews (June 8, 1837 – 1922) was a Hawaii-born artist and engineer. His father Lorrin Andrews (1795–1868) was an early American missionary to Hawaii and a judge.  Prior to leaving Hawaii in 1859, Robert made a number of finely crafter landscape drawings including renderings of the sacrificial stone at Kolekole Pass, Iao Needle, Kapuuohookamoa-Hāmākualoa Falls and Hanapēpē Falls.  He studied engineering on the mainland at Miami University in Oxford, Ohio, and returned to Hawaii in 1863, where he worked as a sugar mill engineer for 30 years.  He remained involved with the church, and spent his retirement years teaching Sunday school.

References
 Severson, Don R., Finding Paradise: Island Art in Private Collections, University of Hawaii Press, 2002, pp. 73–4.
 Siddall, John William, Men of Hawaii, Honolulu, Honolulu Star-Bulletin, 1921, Vol. 2, p. 17.
 Siddall, John William, Men of Hawaii, Honolulu, Honolulu Star-Bulletin, 1917, Vol. 2, pp. 11-13.

Footnotes

Artists from Hawaii
1837 births
1922 deaths
Engineers from Hawaii